Football at the 2011 Pan American Games was held in Guadalajara, Mexico from October 18 to October 28. Associations affiliated with FIFA were invited to send their full women's national teams and men's U-22 teams to participate. In addition teams are allowed to enter a maximum of eighteen athletes.

For these games, the men and women competed in an 8-team tournament, a reduction of 4 teams for men and 2 for women, who competed with 10 teams, from the previous edition of the games.

Medal summary

Medal table

Events

Venue

Men

Women

Schedule
The competition was spread out across eleven days, with the men and women competing on alternating dates.

References

 
2011
Events at the 2011 Pan American Games
2011
Pan
Pan
2011–12 in CONCACAF football